John Hele (3 March 1626 – 25 January 1661) was an English lawyer and politician who sat in the House of Commons between 1659 and 1661.

Hele was the only son of Nicholas Hele of Wembury, Devon and Easton in Gordano, Somerset and his first wife Dorothy Stradling, daughter of Edmund Stradling of Easton in Gordano. He succeeded his father who died in 1640. He matriculated at Christ Church, Oxford on 21 October 1642 aged 16.  He entered  Lincoln's Inn in 1644 and was called to the bar in 1652. He bought the manor of Flanchford before 1656.

In 1659, Hele became a J.P. for Surrey and was commissioner for militia. He was also elected Member of Parliament for Reigate in the Third Protectorate Parliament. He was commissioner for assessment from January 1660 and  commissioner for militia in March 1660. In April 1660 he was re-elected MP for Reigate in the Third Protectorate Parliament. He was also a colonel of militia from  April 1660 and was  commissioner for oyer and terminer for the Home circuit from July 1660.

Hele died intestate at the age of 34.

Hele married  Dorothy, who was daughter of Sir John Hobart, 2nd Baronet., of Blickling, Norfolk and widow of Sir John Hele of Clifton Maybank, Dorset, and of Hugh Rogers of Cannington, Somerset. She married Lord Crofts as her fourth husband "after six weeks’ mourning".

References

1626 births
1661 deaths
Alumni of Christ Church, Oxford
Members of Lincoln's Inn
People from Surrey (before 1889)
English lawyers
17th-century English lawyers
English MPs 1659
English MPs 1660